Levera (PB-02) is a United States-built Dauntless-class patrol boat ordered for the Grenadian Coast Guard. She was in service by September 1995 and was donated to Grenada in a foreign aid package. The builder was SeaArk, and the construction was completed at Monticello, Arkansas in the US.

References
Wertheim, Eric, The Naval Institute Guide to Combat Fleets of the World, 2005-2006; Their Ships, Aircraft, and Systems. US Naval Institute Press, Annapolis, Maryland. 2005.

Patrol vessels of the Coast Guard of Grenada
1995 ships